Deportivo Anlesjeroka is a Mexican football club that plays in the Tercera División de México. The club is based in Tehuacan, Puebla and was founded as Chivas Anlesjeroka in 2006.

History
The club was founded in 2006 in Tehuacan, Puebla, been part of C.D. Guadalajara inferior youth system. In 2007-2008 the club won back to back Torneo de Apertura 2008 en la segunda fuerza which is a regional tournament in Tehuacan, Puebla. The club recently plays in group 3 of the Tercera División de México.

See also
Football in Mexico
Tehuacan
Puebla

Honors
Torneo de Apertura 2008 en la segunda fuerza:(2) 2007,2008

References 

Football clubs in Puebla
Association football clubs established in 2009